"Suicide Solution" is a song by the English heavy metal vocalist singer-songwriter Ozzy Osbourne, from his 1980 debut album Blizzard of Ozz.

Overview
Osbourne said in 1991 that the song was about the alcohol-related death of AC/DC's Bon Scott in 1980, but Bob Daisley revealed in 2002 that he had Osbourne himself in mind when he wrote the lyrics.

Controversy and death of John Daniel McCollum 
On 1 November 1985, a lawsuit against Osbourne and CBS Records was filed by the parents of John Daniel McCollum, a 19-year-old who committed suicide in Riverside, California on 27 October 1984 allegedly after listening to the song. The plaintiffs, however, failed to prove that Osbourne had any responsibility for the teenager's death. The plaintiffs' attorneys alleged that a line in the song stated, "Why try? Get the gun and shoot!" Lyricist Daisley and Osbourne himself both claimed that the line actually says, "Get the flaps out". "Flaps", they insisted, was an English vulgar slang term for "vagina". Don Arden, Black Sabbath's former manager and the father of Sharon Osbourne, is on record as having said of the song's controversial lyrics: "To be perfectly honest, I would be doubtful as to whether Mr. Osbourne knew the meaning of the lyrics, if there was any meaning, because his command of the English language is minimal."

The 1990 horror film Dead Girls was loosely inspired by McCollum's suicide and the subsequent lawsuit over his death.

Personnel
Ozzy Osbourne – vocals
Randy Rhoads – guitars
Bob Daisley – bass guitar
Lee Kerslake – drums
Don Airey – keyboards

See also
 "Better by You, Better Than Me"
 Murder of Elyse Pahler

References

1980 songs
Ozzy Osbourne songs
Songs about alcohol
Songs about suicide
Songs written by Randy Rhoads
Songs written by Ozzy Osbourne
Songs written by Bob Daisley
Obscenity controversies in music